Lemyra excelsa is a moth of the family Erebidae. It was described by Thomas in 1990. It is found in India (Sikkim) and Tibet, China.

References

 

excelsa
Moths described in 1990